Omar Chokhmane (born 15 June 1948) is a Moroccan sprinter. He competed in the men's 200 metres at the 1972 Summer Olympics.

References

1948 births
Living people
Athletes (track and field) at the 1972 Summer Olympics
Moroccan male sprinters
Olympic athletes of Morocco
Place of birth missing (living people)